Riverside–Hunter Park/UCR is a train station in Riverside, California, United States, that opened on June 6, 2016, along with the Perris Valley Line extension of the Metrolink commuter rail system. Despite being named after UCR, there are no buses between the campus and this station. Instead the university recommends that students use Riverside–Downtown station and take Riverside Transit Agency route 1 to campus. Original plans for the extension called for a station adjacent to the campus, but the plan was scrapped after local residents raised concerns about parking and noise.

References

External links 

Metrolink stations in Riverside County, California
2016 establishments in California
Railway stations in the United States opened in 2016
Transportation in Riverside, California
University of California, Riverside